A. Lee Martinez is an American fantasy and science fiction author. He has been a member of the DFW Writers' Workshop since 1995.  He currently resides in Terrell, Texas.

Biography
A. Lee Martinez was born in El Paso, Texas on January 12, 1973.  In 1991, he started writing when he was around 17 years old and graduated from Gadsden High School in Anthony, New Mexico, northwest of El Paso, just across the state line.  He has written eleven published fantasy novels.  His books have been translated into five languages.

Martinez's first published novel, Gil's All Fright Diner (2005), was awarded a 2006 Alex Award, an award given to ten books written for adults that have special appeal to young adults, ages 12 through 18. Gil's also had a featured review in Publishers Weekly.  His fourth novel, The Automatic Detective, also received a featured review in Publishers Weekly.

A. Lee Martinez's other fantasy novels are In the Company of Ogres (2006), A Nameless Witch (2007), Too Many Curses (2008), Monster (2009), Divine Misfortune (2010), Chasing the Moon (2011), Emperor Mollusk Versus The Sinister Brain (2012), Helen and Troy's Epic Road Quest (2013), The Last Adventure of Constance Verity (2016), and Constance Verity Saves the World (2018). Except for the Constance Verity series, all novels are stand-alone-books set in individual universes.

Martinez released a three-part short story after the release of Gil’s All Fright Diner titled "Cranky Dead".  The short story is based in the town of Rockwood where Gil’s All Fright Diner took place.  Registration to the A. Lee Martinez forum is required to access the short story.

In 2019 it was announced that The Last Adventure of Constance Verity would be adapted into a feature motion picture starring Awkwafina from Legendary Entertainment
.

Published works

Novels
 Gil's All Fright Diner (2005)
 In the Company of Ogres (2006)
 A Nameless Witch (2007)
 The Automatic Detective (2008)
 Too Many Curses (2008)
 Monster (2009)
 Divine Misfortune (2010)
 Chasing The Moon (May 2011)
 Emperor Mollusk Versus The Sinister Brain (Mar 2012)
 Helen and Troy's Epic Road Quest (Jul 2013)
 The Last Adventure of Constance Verity (July 2016)
 Constance Verity Saves the World (July 2018)

Collections
 Robots versus Slime Monsters (2013)

Short Stories
 "Black Magic and Silver Bullets" (1997, A. Lee Martinez' official website) (in 2010 considered a lost story  - but since found)
 "Nigh Omnipotent" (1998, A. Lee Martinez' official website) (also once lost)
 "Cranky Dead, Part 1" (September 5, 2006, A. Lee Martinez' official website)
 "Cranky Dead, Part 2" (October 5, 2006, A. Lee Martinez' official website)
 "Cranky Dead, Part 3" (March 3, 2007, A. Lee Martinez' official website)
 "The Hard Holiday" (2007)
 "The Innsmouth Nook" (2010, can be found in Death's Excellent Vacation)
 "The Devil and Danny Webster" (2015, A. Lee Martinez' official website)

References

August 5, 2006 interview with A. Lee Martinez by Dark, But Shining
November 15, 2006 interview with A. Lee Martinez by Matt Staggs of Skullring.org
Podcast of October 10, 2007 interview with A. Lee Martinez by The Dead Robots' Society
Interview With A. Lee Martinez on Monster by Orbitbooks
Blog Article On Gil’s All Fright Diner by A. Lee Martinez
January 12, 2008 interview with A. Lee Martinez by Bibliophile Stalker

External links

A. Lee Martinez's official website
DFW Writers' Workshop website

1973 births
Living people
21st-century American novelists
American fantasy writers
American male novelists
American science fiction writers
People from El Paso, Texas
American male short story writers
21st-century American short story writers
Novelists from Texas
21st-century American male writers
People from Terrell, Texas